The Sou'wester 59 is an American sailboat that was designed by McCurdy & Rhodes as a cruiser and first built in 1982.

Production
The design was built by Hinckley Yachts in the United States, starting in 1982, but it is now out of production.

Design
The Sou'wester 59 is a recreational keelboat, built predominantly of fiberglass, with wood trim. It has a masthead sloop rig or optional ketch rig; a center cockpit; a raked stem; a raised counter, angled transom; a skeg-mounted rudder controlled by a wheel and a fixed fin keel with a retractable centerboard. It displaces  and carries  of lead ballast.

The design has sleeping accommodation for six people, with two single cabins in the bow and two aft cabins, both with double berths. The galley is located on the port side at the forward companionway ladder. The galley is "U"-shaped and is equipped with a stove, an ice box and a double sink. A navigation station is opposite the galley, on the starboard side. There are two heads, one in the forepeak and one on the port side in the aft cabin.

See also
List of sailing boat types

References

External links
Photo of a Sou'wester 59

Keelboats
1980s sailboat type designs
Sailing yachts
Sailboat type designs by McCurdy & Rhodes
Sailboat types built by Hinckley Yachts